Alda Facio Montejo (born 26 January 1948) is a Costa Rican feminist jurist, writer, teacher and international expert in gender and human rights in Latin America. She is one of the founding members of the Women's Caucus for Gender Justice at the International Criminal Court. Since 1991, she has been the Director of Women, Justice and Gender, a program within the United Nations Latin American Institute for the Prevention of Crime and the Treatment of Offenders (ILANUD) and vice president of the Justice and Gender Foundation. She was also one of the founding members of Ventana in the 1970s, one of the first feminist organizations in her native Costa Rica. Since 2014, she has been one of five United Nations special rapporteurs for the Working Group against Discrimination against Women and Girls.

Biography
Alda Facio was born in New York City in the United States of America on 26 January 1948 to lawyer, politician and diplomat Gonzalo Facio Segreda (1918-2018) and his first wife María Lilia Montejo Ortuño. She has a sister, Sandra and a brother, Rómulo. She also has three younger half-sisters through her father's second marriage: Giannina, Ana Catalina and Carla (their mother is Ana Franco Calzia). During the 1960s, when she was 17 or 18, Facio discovered feminism and would later tell the Carnegie Council that her reason for becoming a feminist was that "feminists and feminism gives you strength knowing that you're part of a global movement is something that gives you a lot of energy to move forward."

References

Living people
1948 births
Costa Rican jurists
Costa Rican women writers
Women jurists
20th-century Costa Rican women writers
21st-century Costa Rican women writers
20th-century Costa Rican writers
21st-century Costa Rican writers